The IPSC Czech Shotgun Championship is an IPSC level 3 championship held once a year by the Practical Shooting Association of the Czech Republic.

Champions 
The following is a list of current and previous champions.

Overall category

Senior category

See also 
IPSC Czech Handgun Championship
IPSC Czech Rifle Championship

References 

Match Results - 2006 Czech Shotgun Championship

IPSC shooting competitions
National shooting championships
Shooting competitions in the Czech Republic